PT Puppis (PT Pup) is a star in the constellation Puppis. Anamarija Stankov confirmed this star as a Beta Cephei variable. Analysis of its spectrum and allowing for extinction gives a mass 7.94 times that of the Sun, a surface temperature of 19,400 K and luminosity of 6405 Suns.

References

Puppis
Puppis, PT
Beta Cephei variables
2928
037036
061068
BD-19 1967
B-type bright giants